Jo Giseong (born 20 December 1995) is a Paralympic swimmer from South Korea competing in the S4 classification. He came to prominence at the 2014 Asian Para Games and cemented his reputation with two golds at the 2015 IPC Swimming World Championships in Glasgow where he won two gold medals in the 100m and 200m freestyle events.

References

1995 births
Living people
Paralympic swimmers of South Korea
World record holders in paralympic swimming
S4-classified Paralympic swimmers
Medalists at the World Para Swimming Championships
Swimmers at the 2020 Summer Paralympics
South Korean male freestyle swimmers
21st-century South Korean people
Medalists at the 2018 Asian Para Games